Sambaa K’e (SALM-bah-kay; South Slavey, place of trout) is a lake in the Dehcho Region of the Northwest Territories of Canada. The only settlement on its shores shares the same name; both were officially known as Trout Lake until 2016, when their names were changed to reflect local usage.

Trout River, a tributary of the Mackenzie River, exits the lake from the northeast.

Drinking water for the community of Sambaa K’e comes from the local water treatment facility, which draws water from the lake. Known sources of lake water contamination include the local sewage lagoon, hazardous waste from a World War II-era U.S. Air Force outpost on the lake, and diesel leakage from the local power station.

Fishing for lake trout, walleye, northern pike and Arctic grayling draws tourists to the lake. The local people also rely on the lake environment to support the hunting, trapping and fishing activities that comprise a major part of their livelihood. Common traditional food sources include moose, woodland caribou, grouse, porcupine, beaver, trout, pickerel, duck, and various berries. A proposal to create a  protected area including the Sambaa K’e watershed is currently under study.

References

Lakes of the Northwest Territories
Dehcho Region